Dreamland Manor is the debut album of German power metal band Savage Circus. The album sounds similar to older classic Blind Guardian.

Writing

The band wrote most of the album together. Three songs, however, were written solely by Thomen for the next Blind Guardian album: "Evil Eyes", "It – The Gathering", and the ballad "Beyond Reality". Thomen comments:

Track listing
All music written by: Savage Circus
All lyrics by: Jens Carlsson and Piet Sielck

Trivia
The Japanese bonus track "Ça plane pour moi" is sung in French, however Jens does not speak the language. Emil knows some French, and he wrote down the lyrics at home in Umeå and told Jens how to pronounce it.

Credits
 Jens Carlsson – lead vocals
 Emil Norberg – guitar
 Piet Sielck – guitar, bass, and backing vocals
 Thomas Stauch – drums

Guest musicians
 Rolf Köhler – backing vocals

References

2005 debut albums
Savage Circus albums